Domenic "Mick" Gatto (born 6 August 1955) is a professional mediator within the Victorian building industry; and a debt collector. Gatto was named as a standover man during the Royal Commission into the Building and Construction Industry.

Background and early years
The son of two Italian immigrants from Calabria, Gatto was raised in Melbourne and commenced working in the fruit and vegetable industry. A former boxer, in the 1980s and 1990s, Gatto was involved in Melbourne's illegal gambling scene. In 2004 Gatto was given a ten-year gaming ban, subsequently increased to a life ban.

Murder acquittal

In 2004 Gatto was charged with the murder of Andrew Veniamin, a suspected underworld hitman. Gatto was remanded in custody for 18 months. He was found not guilty at trial, during which Gatto claimed he had acted in self-defence after Veniamin pulled out a .38 and threatened to kill him. Gatto claimed that during a struggle he was able to turn the gun around on Veniamin and fire one shot into his neck, and one shot in the eye. He also claimed that during the argument, Veniamin had implicated himself in the deaths of Dino Dibra, Paul Kallipolitis and Graham Kinniburgh.

At the time of charging Vince Benvenuto with the 2002 murder of Victor Peirce, it was alleged that Gatto had links to both men and to Faruk Orman, the man later convicted of Peirce's murder and acquitted in 2019. No charges were laid against Gatto.

Other matters
In proceedings before the Cole Royal Commission, it was heard that Gatto was involved in resolving certain business disputes. Witnesses attested that Gatto and his business associate, David "the Rock" Hedgcock, had been involved in solving industrial relations problems in the construction industry. One witness, a representative of Baulderstone Hornibrook expressed the fears of a colleague stating, "...he expressed some concerns about his safety, that people associated with this deal were the sorts of people that break legs..." Gatto and Hedgcock's solicitor rejected any implication they had used threats or intimidation. Appearing before the Royal Commission in 2002, Gatto claimed he was being made a scapegoat by the inquiry and strenuously denied he was a standover man.

In 2012, Gatto hosted a fundraising dinner for the Cure for Life Foundation, established by Sydney neurosurgeon Dr Charlie Teo. The concerning relationship between Gatto, an underworld figure, and Dr Teo, a medical professional, was further substantiated in 2019 when The Sydney Morning Herald contacted Dr Teo's office about his alleged sexual harassment of colleagues in Arkansas, United States. Within 24 hours a response was received by one of Gatto's associates.

In 2016, Gatto was charged with possession of an unregistered firearm and of possession of a firearm and ammunition without a licence.

A former boxing promoter, the Napthine government withdrew his fight promotional licence. In 2014 Gatto claimed that he had raised over $4.5 million for charity over ten years. In 2017 it was alleged that Gatto was involved in assisting with resolution of matters involving Stephen Dank and the Essendon Football Club supplements controversy.

In April 2017 it was reported that Gatto settled a long-running dispute with the Australian Taxation Office (ATO). It was claimed that Gatto and his family owed the ATO $15 million; and both parties agreed to settle the matter for less than $4 million. It was reported that in order to pay the ATO, Gatto sold his  home for $4.1 million.

in 2020 Gatto launched a defamation lawsuit against The Australian Broadcasting Corporation. Gatto claimed the article made him out to be a 'murderer' and 'one of Australia's most violent criminals'. In 2021 Justice Andrew Keogh ruled in favour of the ABC, stating "Far from being distorted, the article was entirely accurate and correlated with what occurred in those parts of the Proceedings which were reported."

Published works

In popular culture
In the Australian TV drama series Underbelly based on the Melbourne gangland killings, Gatto was portrayed by actor Simon Westaway, and in the second series, by Luke McKenzie.

References

1955 births
Australian businesspeople
Heavyweight boxers
Living people
Melbourne gangland killings
Australian people of Italian descent
Australian autobiographers
Australian male boxers
Place of birth missing (living people)
Boxers from Melbourne
People acquitted of murder
Australian people of Calabrian descent
Australian organised crime figures